Ariel Nicholson Murtagh (born 2001) is an American model and LGBT rights activist. She was the first openly transgender model to walk in a fashion show for Calvin Klein and the first openly transgender person to appear on the cover of Vogue. Nicholson has also been featured on the cover of Italian Vogue and Love.

Early life 
Nicholson was born and raised in Mahwah, New Jersey. At an early age, she told her parents that she did not "belong as a boy" and, in fifth grade, began using female pronouns and taking Lupron to suppress the effects of male puberty. She was also seeing a therapist from the Ackerman Institute for the Family at the time. When she was in eighth grade she was featured in the PBS documentary Growing Up Trans, where she talked about her decision to go on estradiol.

Career 
While she was a high school student, Nicholson signed with DNA Model Management. She was chosen by Raf Simons to walk for Calvin Klein's 2018 Spring/Summer fashion show, making her modelling debut. She was the first transgender woman to walk in a Calvin Klein fashion show. Nicholson has since appeared in Calvin Klein advertisement campaigns, editorials in Vogue and W, and has walked in runway shows for Marc Jacobs and Miu Miu. She was photographed by Mert & Marcys for the cover of Love'''s anniversary issue.

She was featured on the September 2020 cover of Italian Vogue.

In October 2020, Nicholson was featured in V Magazine's The Thoughts Leaders issue. In 2021, Nicholson became the first openly transgender person to be featured on the cover of Vogue''.

Activism 
She volunteers with Gender & Family Project, an organization that supports transgender youth and their families.

Personal life 
Nicholson lives with her parents and siblings in Park Ridge, New Jersey.

References 

2001 births
Living people
Activists from New Jersey
Female models from New Jersey
LGBT people from New Jersey
American LGBT rights activists
People from Mahwah, New Jersey
People from Park Ridge, New Jersey
Transgender rights activists
Transgender female models
Women civil rights activists
21st-century LGBT people